Jack "Jocko" Nelson (July 12, 1927November 20, 1978) was an American football coach.  He coached football at Utah State University (1955–1957), the University of Colorado (1958), the University of Michigan (1959–1965), Gustavus Adolphus College (1966–1970), and for the Minnesota Vikings of the National Football League (1971–1978).

Early years
Nelson was born in Minnesota in 1927.  He grew up in Hibbing, Minnesota.  He competed for Hibbing High School in basketball, football, track and baseball.  From 1946 to 1950, he attended Gustavus Adolphus College in St. Peter, Minnesota.  Nelson lettered in football, basketball, hockey, track and baseball at Gustavus Adolphus.  He also briefly played professional baseball in the Milwaukee Braves organization.

Coaching career
After graduating from Gustavus Adophus, Nelson spent four years as a teacher and football coach at Grand Marais High School and Mora High School.  In 1955, he was hired as an assistant football coach at Utah State University.  He remained at Utah State until 1958.  From 1958 to 1959, he was an assistant football coach at the University of Colorado.

In 1959, he was hired as a member of Bump Elliott's coaching staff at the University of Michigan.  He was an assistant football coach in charge of the ends at Michigan from 1959 to 1965.

In April 1966, Nelson was named as the head football coach at Gustavus Adolphus College in St. Peter, Minnesota. He also held the title of associate professor of physical education at Gustavus Adophus.  He remained as the head coach at Gustavus Adophus for five years from 1966 to 1970. In 1967 and 1968, his teams won Minnesota Intercollegiate Athletic Conference championships.

In March 1971, Nelson was hired as an assistant defensive coach of the Minnesota Vikings.  He remained with the Vikings' coaching staff for eight years.  From 1971 to 1978, he served as a special teams and linebackers coach for the Vikings.  He helped lead the Vikings' Purple People Eaters defense to three Super Bowls in four years from 1974 to 1977.

In addition to his career as a football coach, Nelson also owned and operated Jocko's Clearwater Lodge & Canoe Outfitters starting in 1964.

Nelson died in November 1978 at Southdale Hospital in Minneapolis, 18 days after suffering from a heart attack while playing racquetball or handball with Vikings' defensive coordinator Bob Hollway.  He died during the first quarter of the Vikings' game against the San Diego Chargers, and head coach Bud Grant learned of Nelson's death shortly before halftime.  The team wore black armbands for the last four games in 1978 in memory of Nelson.  Nelson and his wife, Lee, had four children.

Nelson was posthumously inducted into the Gustavus Adolphus College Athletics Hall of Fame in 1979.

Head coaching record

References

1927 births
1978 deaths
Colorado Buffaloes football coaches
Michigan Wolverines football coaches
Minnesota Vikings coaches
Utah State Aggies football coaches
Gustavus Adolphus Golden Gusties football coaches
Gustavus Adolphus Golden Gusties football players
Place of birth missing
Players of American football from Minnesota
Sportspeople from Hibbing, Minnesota